The Ministry or Board of Rites was one of the Six Ministries of government in late imperial China. It was part of the imperial Chinese government from the Tang (7th century) until the 1911 Xinhai Revolution. Along with religious rituals and court ceremonial the Ministry of Rites also oversaw the imperial examination and China's foreign relations.

A Ministry of Rites also existed in imperial Vietnam. One of its tasks was enforcing the naming taboo.

History
Under the Han, similar functions were performed by the Ministry of Ceremonies. In early medieval China, its functions were performed by other officials including the Grand Herald. Under the Song (10th-13th centuries), its functions were temporarily transferred to the Zhongshu Sheng. Its administration of China's foreign relations was ended by the establishment of the Zongli Yamen in 1861.

Functions
Management of imperial court ceremonies and ritual offerings.
Registration and supervision of Buddhist and Taoist priests within China.
Management of the Imperial examinations.
Foreign relations.

References

Citations

Sources

See also 

 The Book of Rites
 Ministry of Ceremonies under the Han
 Bureau of Buddhist and Tibetan Affairs (Yuan) and Board for the Administration of Outlying Regions (Qing), overseeing Tibetan Buddhism
 State Administration for Religious Affairs under the PRC State Council

Government of Imperial China
Six Ministries
China
China
China
China
Foreign relations of Imperial China
Imperial examination